On December 7, 2019, a plebiscite was held to determine if residents of the Philippine province of Compostela Valley approve the renaming of their province to Davao de Oro.

Background
The province of Compostela Valley was carved out from Davao del Norte in 1998. In early 2019, Republic Act No. 11297 was passed into law renaming Compostela Valley to Davao de Oro, subject to the province's residents' approval in a plebiscite. The legislation was signed into law by President Rodrigo Duterte on April 17, 2019 and the signing was made known to the public on May 23, 2019. The Philippine national government's Commission on Elections (Comelec) was tasked to supervise and conduct the required plebiscite.

Republic Act No. 11297 was proposed as House Bill 7363, which was filed before the House of Representatives on May 15, 2018, and Senate Bill 1746, which was filed before the Senate on December 10, 2018. Representatives Pedro Acharon Jr., Ruwel Peter Gonzaga, and Maria Carmen Zamora were the proponents of HB 7363 and Senators Juan Miguel Zubiri and Sonny Angara were the proponents of the Senate counterpart of the House bill. The two proposed bills were consolidated on January 29, 2019. Supporters of the renaming said that renaming Compostella Valley to Davao de Oro would strengthen the association of the province with the rest of the Davao Region; prior to the plebiscite, Davao de Oro as Compostella Valley was the only province in the region without "Davao" in its name.

As per Resolution No. 10614 of Comelec, all voters in the 11 municipalities of Compostela Valley who voted in the 2019 Philippine general election were eligible to participate.

Preparations

Campaign
Since March 2019, the provincial government of Compostela Valley led by governor Jayvee Tyron Uy started the campaign to convince voters to approve the renaming of their province. Jayvee Uy's campaign was helped by Arturo Uy, his father and a former governor of his province. The proposed name of "Davao de Oro" was formally launched on March 8, 2019 during the Bulawan Festival.

Organization
Polling for the plebiscite was scheduled to run from 7 a.m. to 3 p.m. on December 7, 2019.  was allocated for the conduct of the plebiscite. President Rodrigo Duterte also directed the police and the military to ensure the security of the province during the plebiscite. A province-wide gun ban was imposed in Compostela Valley from November 7 to December 7, 2019 and at least one police checkpoint was set up in each of the province's 11 municipalities.

Question
The question used in the ballot was in Filipino and voters were asked to vote either "yes" or "no". The question was:

"Pumapayag ka ba na palitan ang pangalan ng lalawigan ng Compostela Valley at gawing lalawigan ng Davao de Oro  alinsunod sa Batas Republika bilang 11297?"

Voters wrote "yes" or "no" or its equivalent in Filipino.

Results
The results of the plebiscite was counted manually and was submitted to the Provincial Plebiscite Board of Canvassers.

The turnout of the plebiscite as per the Comelec was around 45 percent which translates to 178,953 participants out of the 410,262 eligible votes. Majority of the voters favored the renaming with 174,442 voting "yes" and 5,020 voted "no". Canvassing was slowed due to inconsistencies regarding the number of votes in four municipalities. The results of the plebiscite was approved by the Comelec at 10:24 p.m. on December 8, 2019.

By municipality 
The measure was accepted in all municipalities by overwhelming margins. The municipality of Compostela had the largest proportion of "no" votes.

By legislative district 
Likewise, the measure was accepted in both legislative districts.

References

2019 in the Philippines
Provincial plebiscites in the Philippines
2019 referendums
Presidency of Rodrigo Duterte
History of Davao de Oro
Name referendums